Renanolone (INN), or 11-ketopregnanolone, also known as 5β-pregnan-3α-ol-11,20-dione, is a synthetic neuroactive steroid which is described as a general anesthetic but was never introduced for clinical use. Its isomers, alfaxolone and alfadolone, are also general anesthetics, and are known to act as positive allosteric modulators of the GABAA receptor, a property which is likely the case for renanolone as well.

Chemistry

See also
 Alfadolone
 Alfaxolone
 Ganaxolone
 Hydroxydione
 Minaxolone
 Pregnanolone

References

5β-Pregnanes
General anesthetics
Neurosteroids
Secondary alcohols
Diketones
GABAA receptor positive allosteric modulators